Spinkhill is a small village in North East Derbyshire, England. It is approximately one mile south of the nearest town, Killamarsh, and half a mile north-east of Renishaw.

It is home to the Church of the Immaculate Conception and its associated Catholic Primary School. Spinkhill is also home to Mount St Mary's College, a large private school. The village has strong historical links to the Roman Catholic Church via the Poles family.

Spinkill has two commercial establishments, the Angel pub, saved from housing development by a community interest company (CIC). It was re opened  in 2015 by an independent landlord and thrives as a gastro pub.

Opposite the Angel is the former Post Office (closed over 20 years ago) which opened as a vintage tea/artisan coffee shop called the Chaffinch Room in 2017, which also serves food and sells gifts.

Other economic activity comes from the several farms situated around the village.

The village has a small bus station and is served by a handful of bus services to Sheffield and Chesterfield via Killamarsh and Renishaw, respectively. Spinkhill railway station served the village prior to its permanent closure in 1958.

See also
Listed buildings in Eckington, Derbyshire

References

Villages in Derbyshire
Eckington, Derbyshire